The 1959 Major League Baseball season saw the Pittsburgh Pirates finish in fourth place in the National League at 78–76, nine games behind the NL and World Series Champion Los Angeles Dodgers. The Pirates set the record for most extra innings victories in a season, winning 19 of their 21 extra inning games.

Offseason 
 January 30, 1959: Whammy Douglas, Jim Pendleton, Frank Thomas, and John Powers were traded by the Pirates to the Cincinnati Reds for Smoky Burgess, Harvey Haddix and Don Hoak.
 Prior to 1959 season: Dick Rand was traded by the Pirates to the St. Louis Cardinals for Tom Burgess.

Regular season 
 May 26, 1959: Harvey Haddix took a perfect game into the 13th inning of a game against the Milwaukee Braves. Haddix retired 36 consecutive batters in 12 innings, but lost the game 1–0. Braves pitcher Lew Burdette also pitched a shutout for 13 full innings, giving up 12 hits.  NOTE: On September 4, 1991, MLB redefined no-hitters to no longer include games in which the first hit was surrendered in extra innings. Until then, Haddix had been credited with a perfect game.

Season standings

Record vs. opponents

Game log

|- bgcolor="ffbbbb"
| 1 || April 9 || @ Reds || 1–4 || Purkey || Kline (0–1) || — || 32,190 || 0–1
|- bgcolor="ffbbbb"
| 2 || April 10 || Braves || 0–8 || Spahn || Friend (0–1) || — || 33,317 || 0–2
|- bgcolor="ffbbbb"
| 3 || April 11 || Braves || 3–4 || Burdette || Law (0–1) || — || 11,800 || 0–3
|- bgcolor="ffbbbb"
| 4 || April 14 || @ Reds || 2–3 || Purkey || Witt (0–1) || — || 7,631 || 0–4
|- bgcolor="ffbbbb"
| 5 || April 15 || @ Reds || 5–10 || Nuxhall || Friend (0–2) || Mabe || 3,228 || 0–5
|- bgcolor="ffffff"
| 6 || April 17 || @ Braves || 2–2 ||  ||  || — || 8,562 || 0–5
|- bgcolor="ccffcc"
| 7 || April 18 || @ Braves || 11–5 || Law (1–1) || Buhl || — || 15,703 || 1–5
|- bgcolor="ccffcc"
| 8 || April 22 || Reds || 9–8 || Face (1–0) || Pena || — || 16,038 || 2–5
|- bgcolor="ffbbbb"
| 9 || April 23 || Reds || 2–5 || Lawrence || Witt (0–2) || — || 18,819 || 2–6
|- bgcolor="ccffcc"
| 10 || April 24 || @ Phillies || 8–5 || Face (2–0) || Schroll || — || 15,675 || 3–6
|- bgcolor="ccffcc"
| 11 || April 25 || @ Phillies || 4–2 || Haddix (1–0) || Morehead || — || 6,678 || 4–6
|- bgcolor="ccffcc"
| 12 || April 26 || @ Phillies || 9–2 || Law (2–1) || Cardwell || — ||  || 5–6
|- bgcolor="ffbbbb"
| 13 || April 26 || @ Phillies || 5–10 || Meyer || Friend (0–3) || — || 19,266 || 5–7
|- bgcolor="ffbbbb"
| 14 || April 27 || Dodgers || 3–9 || Drysdale || Witt (0–3) || — || 10,689 || 5–8
|- bgcolor="ccffcc"
| 15 || April 29 || Giants || 3–2 || Kline (1–1) || Antonelli || — || 19,799 || 6–8
|-

|- bgcolor="ffbbbb"
| 16 || May 1 || Cardinals || 6–7 || Mizell || Friend (0–4) || Brosnan || 18,950 || 6–9
|- bgcolor="ccffcc"
| 17 || May 2 || Cardinals || 2–1 || Haddix (2–0) || McDaniel || — || 10,758 || 7–9
|- bgcolor="ccffcc"
| 18 || May 3 || Cardinals || 4–3 (10) || Face (3–0) || Brosnan || — ||  || 8–9
|- bgcolor="ffbbbb"
| 19 || May 3 || Cardinals || 1–3 || Blaylock || Daniels (0–1) || McDaniel || 26,080 || 8–10
|- bgcolor="ccffcc"
| 20 || May 4 || Cubs || 2–1 || Kline (2–1) || Anderson || Face (1) || 14,421 || 9–10
|- bgcolor="ffbbbb"
| 21 || May 5 || Cubs || 3–6 || Hobbie || Friend (0–5) || — || 17,429 || 9–11
|- bgcolor="ffbbbb"
| 22 || May 6 || Cubs || 0–3 || Hillman || Haddix (2–1) || — || 5,860 || 9–12
|- bgcolor="ccffcc"
| 23 || May 7 || Phillies || 5–4 (10) || Face (4–0) || Owens || — || 10,358 || 10–12
|- bgcolor="ffbbbb"
| 24 || May 8 || Phillies || 1–8 || Conley || Witt (0–4) || Farrell || 17,691 || 10–13
|- bgcolor="ccffcc"
| 25 || May 9 || Phillies || 9–1 || Kline (3–1) || Gomez || — || 9,633 || 11–13
|- bgcolor="ffbbbb"
| 26 || May 10 || Phillies || 3–6 || Roberts || Friend (0–6) || Farrell ||  || 11–14
|- bgcolor="ccffcc"
| 27 || May 10 || Phillies || 7–6 || Haddix (3–1) || Hearn || Face (2) || 23,549 || 12–14
|- bgcolor="ffbbbb"
| 28 || May 11 || @ Giants || 4–14 || Sanford || Daniels (0–2) || — || 13,789 || 12–15
|- bgcolor="ccffcc"
| 29 || May 12 || @ Giants || 6–5 (12) || Daniels (1–2) || Jones || — || 8,084 || 13–15
|- bgcolor="ccffcc"
| 30 || May 13 || @ Dodgers || 6–4 || Face (5–0) || Drysdale || — || 16,718 || 14–15
|- bgcolor="ccffcc"
| 31 || May 14 || @ Dodgers || 7–6 || Face (6–0) || Labine || — || 15,416 || 15–15
|- bgcolor="ffbbbb"
| 32 || May 16 || @ Cubs || 2–3 || Elston || Haddix (3–2) || — || 10,496 || 15–16
|- bgcolor="ccffcc"
| 33 || May 17 || @ Cubs || 5–4 || Law (3–1) || Anderson || Face (3) ||  || 16–16
|- bgcolor="ffbbbb"
| 34 || May 17 || @ Cubs || 6–7 || Hobbie || Daniels (1–3) || Henry || 32,017 || 16–17
|- bgcolor="ffbbbb"
| 35 || May 19 || @ Cardinals || 2–8 || Jackson || Kline (3–2) || — || 8,470 || 16–18
|- bgcolor="ffbbbb"
| 36 || May 20 || @ Cardinals || 1–11 || Mizell || Friend (0–7) || — || 8,555 || 16–19
|- bgcolor="ccffcc"
| 37 || May 21 || @ Cardinals || 7–2 || Haddix (4–2) || McDaniel || — || 8,141 || 17–19
|- bgcolor="ccffcc"
| 38 || May 22 || Reds || 4–3 || Law (4–1) || Jeffcoat || — || 27,675 || 18–19
|- bgcolor="ccffcc"
| 39 || May 23 || Reds || 6–5 || Daniels (2–3) || Pena || Blackburn (1) || 13,119 || 19–19
|- bgcolor="ccffcc"
| 40 || May 24 || Reds || 2–1 || Kline (4–2) || Lawrence || — ||  || 20–19
|- bgcolor="ccffcc"
| 41 || May 24 || Reds || 5–4 (10) || Blackburn (1–0) || Purkey || — || 32,273 || 21–19
|- bgcolor="ffbbbb"
| 42 || May 26 || @ Braves || 0–1 (13) || Burdette || Haddix (4–3) || — || 19,194 || 21–20
|- bgcolor="ffbbbb"
| 43 || May 27 || @ Braves || 3–4 || Spahn || Law (4–2) || McMahon || 17,721 || 21–21
|- bgcolor="ccffcc"
| 44 || May 28 || @ Braves || 3–0 || Friend (1–7) || Jay || — || 12,635 || 22–21
|- bgcolor="ffbbbb"
| 45 || May 29 || @ Reds || 5–8 || Mabe || Kline (4–3) || Acker || 18,958 || 22–22
|- bgcolor="ccffcc"
| 46 || May 30 || @ Reds || 3–1 || Daniels (3–3) || O'Toole || Face (4) || 8,613 || 23–22
|- bgcolor="ccffcc"
| 47 || May 31 || @ Reds || 6–2 || Law (5–2) || Purkey || — ||  || 24–22
|- bgcolor="ccffcc"
| 48 || May 31 || @ Reds || 14–11 || Face (7–0) || Mabe || — || 17,847 || 25–22
|-

|- bgcolor="ccffcc"
| 49 || June 2 || Cardinals || 3–0 || Haddix (5–3) || Jackson || — || 28,644 || 26–22
|- bgcolor="ccffcc"
| 50 || June 3 || Cardinals || 5–3 || Friend (2–7) || Mizell || Face (5) || 16,857 || 27–22
|- bgcolor="ccffcc"
| 51 || June 4 || Cardinals || 9–3 || Kline (5–3) || Broglio || — || 7,555 || 28–22
|- bgcolor="ffbbbb"
| 52 || June 5 || Cubs || 5–10 || Hobbie || Law (5–3) || Elston || 27,335 || 28–23
|- bgcolor="ffbbbb"
| 53 || June 6 || Cubs || 2–8 || Drabowsky || Daniels (3–4) || — || 12,953 || 28–24
|- bgcolor="ffbbbb"
| 54 || June 7 || Cubs || 2–4 || Buzhardt || Haddix (5–4) || Henry ||  || 28–25
|- bgcolor="ffbbbb"
| 55 || June 7 || Cubs || 0–1 || Singleton || Friend (2–8) || Elston || 32,078 || 28–26
|- bgcolor="ccffcc"
| 56 || June 8 || Giants || 12–9 (11) || Face (8–0) || McCormick || — || 19,080 || 29–26
|- bgcolor="ffbbbb"
| 57 || June 9 || Giants || 2–6 || Antonelli || Law (5–4) || — || 24,272 || 29–27
|- bgcolor="ffbbbb"
| 58 || June 10 || Giants || 7–11 || Jones || Witt (0–5) || Miller || 24,317 || 29–28
|- bgcolor="ccffcc"
| 59 || June 11 || Giants || 12–9 || Face (9–0) || Miller || Law (1) || 9,444 || 30–28
|- bgcolor="ffbbbb"
| 60 || June 12 || Dodgers || 6–9 || McDevitt || Daniels (3–5) || Erskine || 27,970 || 30–29
|- bgcolor="ccffcc"
| 61 || June 13 || Dodgers || 5–3 || Kline (6–3) || Fowler || — || 11,944 || 31–29
|- bgcolor="ccffcc"
| 62 || June 14 || Dodgers || 6–3 || Face (10–0) || Labine || — ||  || 32–29
|- bgcolor="ccffcc"
| 63 || June 14 || Dodgers || 5–2 || Law (6–4) || Erskine || — || 30,082 || 33–29
|- bgcolor="ccffcc"
| 64 || June 16 || @ Cubs || 5–2 || Friend (3–8) || Hillman || Face (6) || 10,391 || 34–29
|- bgcolor="ffbbbb"
| 65 || June 17 || @ Cubs || 2–5 || Henry || Haddix (5–5) || — || 10,230 || 34–30
|- bgcolor="ccffcc"
| 66 || June 18 || @ Cubs || 4–2 (13) || Face (11–0) || Henry || — || 7,562 || 35–30
|- bgcolor="ccffcc"
| 67 || June 19 || @ Cardinals || 6–0 || Law (7–4) || Ricketts || — || 17,461 || 36–30
|- bgcolor="ffbbbb"
| 68 || June 20 || @ Cardinals || 2–5 || Mizell || Friend (3–9) || McDaniel || 10,698 || 36–31
|- bgcolor="ffbbbb"
| 69 || June 21 || @ Cardinals || 1–5 || Jackson || Haddix (5–6) || McDaniel ||  || 36–32
|- bgcolor="ccffcc"
| 70 || June 21 || @ Cardinals || 10–8 || Daniels (4–5) || Blaylock || Face (7) || 23,731 || 37–32
|- bgcolor="ffbbbb"
| 71 || June 22 || @ Giants || 1–4 || Fisher || Kline (6–4) || Worthington || 11,002 || 37–33
|- bgcolor="ccffcc"
| 72 || June 23 || @ Giants || 5–1 || Law (8–4) || Jones || — || 22,706 || 38–33
|- bgcolor="ffbbbb"
| 73 || June 24 || @ Giants || 3–4 || McCormick || Daniels (4–6) || — || 12,643 || 38–34
|- bgcolor="ccffcc"
| 74 || June 25 || @ Giants || 3–1 (12) || Face (12–0) || Fisher || — || 11,487 || 39–34
|- bgcolor="ffbbbb"
| 75 || June 26 || @ Dodgers || 5–6 || Podres || Kline (6–5) || McDevitt || 22,719 || 39–35
|- bgcolor="ffbbbb"
| 76 || June 27 || @ Dodgers || 0–3 || Koufax || Law (8–5) || — || 31,649 || 39–36
|- bgcolor="ffbbbb"
| 77 || June 28 || @ Dodgers || 4–9 || McDevitt || Friend (3–10) || Drysdale || 27,785 || 39–37
|- bgcolor="ccffcc"
| 78 || June 30 || @ Phillies || 4–3 || Haddix (6–6) || Roberts || Face (8) || 11,149 || 40–37
|-

|- bgcolor="ffbbbb"
| 79 || July 1 || @ Phillies || 0–1 || Conley || Kline (6–6) || — || 7,897 || 40–38
|- bgcolor="ccffcc"
| 80 || July 2 || Braves || 4–3 (10) || Law (9–5) || McMahon || — || 28,282 || 41–38
|- bgcolor="ffbbbb"
| 81 || July 3 || Braves || 0–6 || Pizarro || Witt (0–6) || — || 34,093 || 41–39
|- bgcolor="ccffcc"
| 82 || July 4 || Reds || 4–3 || Friend (4–10) || Nuxhall || — || 16,548 || 42–39
|- bgcolor="ccffcc"
| 83 || July 5 || Reds || 7–5 || Haddix (7–6) || Lawrence || Face (9) ||  || 43–39
|- bgcolor="ccffcc"
| 84 || July 5 || Reds || 3–2 (11) || Kline (7–6) || Pena || — || 22,622 || 44–39
|- bgcolor="ccffcc"
| 85 || July 9 || Cubs || 4–3 (10) || Face (13–0) || Henry || — || 22,080 || 45–39
|- bgcolor="ccffcc"
| 86 || July 10 || Cubs || 7–6 (11) || Daniels (5–6) || Elston || — || 25,360 || 46–39
|- bgcolor="ffbbbb"
| 87 || July 11 || Cubs || 1–5 || Hillman || Kline (7–7) || — || 15,110 || 46–40
|- bgcolor="ccffcc"
| 88 || July 12 || Cardinals || 6–5 (10) || Face (14–0) || McDaniel || — ||  || 47–40
|- bgcolor="ffbbbb"
| 89 || July 12 || Cardinals || 6–8 (10) || McDaniel || Porterfield (0–1) || — || 25,530 || 47–41
|- bgcolor="ccffcc"
| 90 || July 14 || Dodgers || 9–1 || Law (10–5) || Podres || — || 30,199 || 48–41
|- bgcolor="ffbbbb"
| 91 || July 15 || Dodgers || 0–3 || Drysdale || Friend (4–11) || — || 28,268 || 48–42
|- bgcolor="ffbbbb"
| 92 || July 17 || Giants || 1–4 || Jones || Kline (7–8) || — || 33,220 || 48–43
|- bgcolor="ffbbbb"
| 93 || July 18 || Giants || 3–4 || Fisher || Haddix (7–7) || McCormick || 20,577 || 48–44
|- bgcolor="ccffcc"
| 94 || July 19 || Giants || 3–2 || Law (11–5) || Miller || — || 27,992 || 49–44
|- bgcolor="ffbbbb"
| 95 || July 21 || Phillies || 2–4 || Roberts || Friend (4–12) || — || 25,960 || 49–45
|- bgcolor="ffbbbb"
| 96 || July 22 || Phillies || 4–11 || Conley || Kline (7–9) || — || 17,024 || 49–46
|- bgcolor="ffbbbb"
| 97 || July 24 || @ Braves || 0–8 || Pizarro || Haddix (7–8) || — || 27,708 || 49–47
|- bgcolor="ffbbbb"
| 98 || July 25 || @ Braves || 0–3 || Burdette || Law (11–6) || — || 25,295 || 49–48
|- bgcolor="ffbbbb"
| 99 || July 26 || @ Braves || 0–4 || Spahn || Friend (4–13) || — ||  || 49–49
|- bgcolor="ffbbbb"
| 100 || July 26 || @ Braves || 1–2 || Buhl || Witt (0–7) || McMahon || 39,420 || 49–50
|- bgcolor="ffbbbb"
| 101 || July 27 || @ Braves || 2–5 || Jay || Kline (7–10) || — || 15,817 || 49–51
|- bgcolor="ffbbbb"
| 102 || July 28 || @ Dodgers || 4–9 || Williams || Blackburn (1–1) || — || 23,493 || 49–52
|- bgcolor="ffbbbb"
| 103 || July 29 || @ Dodgers || 0–2 || Craig || Law (11–7) || — || 24,324 || 49–53
|- bgcolor="ccffcc"
| 104 || July 30 || @ Dodgers || 5–4 (12) || Daniels (6–6) || Williams || Gross (1) || 24,221 || 50–53
|- bgcolor="ffbbbb"
| 105 || July 31 || @ Giants || 3–4 || Sanford || Haddix (7–9) || — || 22,371 || 50–54
|-

|- bgcolor="ffbbbb"
| 106 || August 1 || @ Giants || 5–9 || Byerly || Daniels (6–7) || Miller || 21,567 || 50–55
|- bgcolor="ffbbbb"
| 107 || August 2 || @ Giants || 3–5 || Antonelli || Porterfield (0–2) || — || 22,653 || 50–56
|- bgcolor="ccffcc"
| 108 || August 4 || @ Cardinals || 7–3 || Law (12–7) || Gibson || — || 10,971 || 51–56
|- bgcolor="ffbbbb"
| 109 || August 5 || @ Cardinals || 0–3 || Broglio || Friend (4–14) || — || 8,079 || 51–57
|- bgcolor="ccffcc"
| 110 || August 6 || @ Cardinals || 18–2 || Haddix (8–9) || Jackson || — || 8,503 || 52–57
|- bgcolor="ffbbbb"
| 111 || August 7 || @ Cubs || 0–4 || Drabowsky || Kline (7–11) || — || 7,434 || 52–58
|- bgcolor="ccffcc"
| 112 || August 8 || @ Cubs || 4–3 (14) || Gross (1–0) || Donnelly || — || 5,693 || 53–58
|- bgcolor="ccffcc"
| 113 || August 9 || @ Cubs || 5–3 (10) || Face (15–0) || Elston || — || 19,138 || 54–58
|- bgcolor="ffbbbb"
| 114 || August 11 || @ Phillies || 4–6 || Cardwell || Friend (4–15) || Farrell || 12,127 || 54–59
|- bgcolor="ccffcc"
| 115 || August 12 || @ Phillies || 6–2 || Haddix (9–9) || Roberts || — || 11,163 || 55–59
|- bgcolor="ccffcc"
| 116 || August 14 || Braves || 2–1 || Law (13–7) || Jay || — || 26,873 || 56–59
|- bgcolor="ccffcc"
| 117 || August 15 || Braves || 10–8 || Kline (8–11) || Burdette || Green (1) || 34,478 || 57–59
|- bgcolor="ccffcc"
| 118 || August 16 || Braves || 2–1 || Friend (5–15) || Pizarro || Porterfield (1) ||  || 58–59
|- bgcolor="ffbbbb"
| 119 || August 16 || Braves || 2–5 || Spahn || Daniels (6–8) || — || 24,518 || 58–60
|- bgcolor="ccffcc"
| 120 || August 17 || Cubs || 7–6 || Green (1–0) || Henry || — || 12,815 || 59–60
|- bgcolor="ccffcc"
| 121 || August 19 || Cardinals || 4–2 || Law (14–7) || Gibson || — || 19,075 || 60–60
|- bgcolor="ccffcc"
| 122 || August 20 || Cardinals || 3–1 || Friend (6–15) || Broglio || — || 8,059 || 61–60
|- bgcolor="ffbbbb"
| 123 || August 21 || Dodgers || 5–6 || Podres || Kline (8–12) || Koufax || 24,678 || 61–61
|- bgcolor="ccffcc"
| 124 || August 22 || Dodgers || 2–0 || Daniels (7–8) || Craig || Gross (2) || 10,260 || 62–61
|- bgcolor="ccffcc"
| 125 || August 23 || Dodgers || 9–2 || Haddix (10–9) || Drysdale || — ||  || 63–61
|- bgcolor="ccffcc"
| 126 || August 23 || Dodgers || 4–3 (10) || Face (16–0) || Drysdale || — || 25,173 || 64–61
|- bgcolor="ccffcc"
| 127 || August 24 || Giants || 6–0 || Friend (7–15) || Jones || — || 23,617 || 65–61
|- bgcolor="ffbbbb"
| 128 || August 25 || Giants || 5–12 || Antonelli || Kline (8–13) || — || 29,927 || 65–62
|- bgcolor="ccffcc"
| 129 || August 26 || Giants || 5–4 (10) || Kline (9–13) || Miller || — || 20,244 || 66–62
|- bgcolor="ccffcc"
| 130 || August 28 || Phillies || 9–0 || Law (15–7) || Keegan || — || 20,926 || 67–62
|- bgcolor="ccffcc"
| 131 || August 29 || Phillies || 11–1 || Friend (8–15) || Roberts || — || 9,714 || 68–62
|- bgcolor="ccffcc"
| 132 || August 30 || Phillies || 2–1 || Haddix (11–9) || Robinson || — ||  || 69–62
|- bgcolor="ccffcc"
| 133 || August 30 || Phillies || 7–6 (10) || Face (17–0) || Farrell || — || 20,015 || 70–62
|-

|- bgcolor="ffbbbb"
| 134 || September 2 || @ Reds || 3–6 || O'Toole || Law (15–8) || — ||  || 70–63
|- bgcolor="ffbbbb"
| 135 || September 2 || @ Reds || 1–2 || Newcombe || Friend (8–16) || — || 13,014 || 70–64
|- bgcolor="ffbbbb"
| 136 || September 4 || @ Phillies || 0–3 || Owens || Haddix (11–10) || — || 13,136 || 70–65
|- bgcolor="ccffcc"
| 137 || September 5 || @ Phillies || 7–6 || Porterfield (1–2) || Farrell || Daniels (1) || 5,993 || 71–65
|- bgcolor="ffbbbb"
| 138 || September 6 || @ Phillies || 1–2 || Roberts || Law (15–9) || — || 9,684 || 71–66
|- bgcolor="ffbbbb"
| 139 || September 7 || @ Braves || 1–5 || Burdette || Friend (8–17) || — ||  || 71–67
|- bgcolor="ffbbbb"
| 140 || September 7 || @ Braves || 1–4 || Buhl || Daniels (7–9) || — || 26,910 || 71–68
|- bgcolor="ffbbbb"
| 141 || September 9 || @ Giants || 2–7 || Sanford || Haddix (11–11) || Miller || 22,768 || 71–69
|- bgcolor="ccffcc"
| 142 || September 10 || @ Giants || 5–3 || Law (16–9) || Antonelli || — || 14,130 || 72–69
|- bgcolor="ffbbbb"
| 143 || September 11 || @ Dodgers || 4–5 || Churn || Face (17–1) || — ||  || 72–70
|- bgcolor="ffbbbb"
| 144 || September 11 || @ Dodgers || 0–4 || Sherry || Green (1–1) || — || 48,526 || 72–71
|- bgcolor="ccffcc"
| 145 || September 13 || @ Dodgers || 4–3 || Kline (10–13) || Churn || — || 20,176 || 73–71
|- bgcolor="ccffcc"
| 146 || September 16 || @ Cubs || 3–2 || Law (17–9) || Anderson || — ||  || 74–71
|- bgcolor="ffbbbb"
| 147 || September 16 || @ Cubs || 2–4 || Elston || Friend (8–18) || — || 1,366 || 74–72
|- bgcolor="ccffcc"
| 148 || September 17 || @ Cardinals || 7–0 || Haddix (12–11) || Jackson || — || 4,970 || 75–72
|- bgcolor="ccffcc"
| 149 || September 19 || Reds || 4–3 (12) || Face (18–1) || Lawrence || — || 8,406 || 76–72
|- bgcolor="ccffcc"
| 150 || September 20 || Reds || 10–1 || Law (18–9) || Brosnan || — || 21,068 || 77–72
|- bgcolor="ffbbbb"
| 151 || September 21 || Braves || 6–8 || Spahn || Friend (8–19) || McMahon || 17,205 || 77–73
|- bgcolor="ffbbbb"
| 152 || September 22 || Braves || 3–5 || Pizarro || Haddix (12–12) || McMahon || 17,658 || 77–74
|- bgcolor="ccffcc"
| 153 || September 23 || Braves || 5–4 || Kline (11–13) || Jay || Face (10) || 20,502 || 78–74
|- bgcolor="ffbbbb"
| 154 || September 26 || @ Reds || 6–7 || Purkey || Gross (1–1) || — || 4,703 || 78–75
|- bgcolor="ffbbbb"
| 155 || September 27 || @ Reds || 7–9 || Nuxhall || Green (1–2) || Purkey || 15,522 || 78–76
|-

|-
| Legend:       = Win       = Loss       = TieBold = Pirates team member

Opening Day lineup

Notable transactions 
 May 29, 1959: Gene Baker was released by the Pirates.
 June 13, 1959: Bob Smith was selected off waivers from the Pirates by the Detroit Tigers.

Roster

Player stats

Batting

Starters by position 
Note: Pos = Position; G = Games played; AB = At bats; H = Hits; Avg. = Batting average; HR = Home runs; RBI = Runs batted in

Other batters 
Note: G = Games played; AB = At bats; H = Hits; Avg. = Batting average; HR = Home runs; RBI = Runs batted in

Pitching

Starting pitchers 
Note: G = Games pitched; IP = Innings pitched; W = Wins; L = Losses; ERA = Earned run average; SO = Strikeouts

Other pitchers 
Note: G = Games pitched; IP = Innings pitched; W = Wins; L = Losses; ERA = Earned run average; SO = Strikeouts

Relief pitchers 
Note: G = Games pitched; W = Wins; L = Losses; SV = Saves; ERA = Earned run average; SO = Strikeouts

Awards and honors

Records 
 Roy Face, major league record, most wins in one season by a relief pitcher (18)
 Harvey Haddix, major league record, Most consecutive batters retired in one game (36)

Farm system

References

External links
 1959 Pittsburgh Pirates at Baseball Reference
 1959 Pittsburgh Pirates at Baseball Almanac

Pittsburgh Pirates seasons
Pittsburgh Pirates season
Pittsburg Pir